KKGX (920 AM) is a radio station licensed to Palm Springs, California, United States. The station is owned by Louie Comella through licensee IVOX MEDIA, LLC and serves the Coachella Valley area. Both KKGX and sister station KWXY are based in the original KWXY Broadcast Center building in Cathedral City. Under the previous ownership, the original 1964 "KWXY" neon lettering on the building's façade was replaced by modern, back-lit LED lettering identifying the stations as "KGX". The neon letters are presently undergoing restoration and will be relocated to the façade once completed.

History

The station was originally issued the call sign KGEC, but took the call sign KDES on September 6, 1956. KDES signed on October 29, 1956. The station was assigned the call letters KKAM on October 15, 1984; on August 17, 1987, the station changed its call sign back to KDES. The station became KESQ on June 1, 1994, but returned to the KDES call sign on November 1, 1995. On September 1, 1997, the call letters were changed to KPSI. The KPSI call letters, which stood for "Keeping Palm Springs Informed", were previously used on 1450 AM (later KCOD).

Until August 12, 2016, the station's lineup included Rush Limbaugh, Glenn Beck, Dennis Prager, Mark Levin, Dennis Miller, Michael Savage, and local host Rich Gilgallon. KPSI was also a member of the Los Angeles Dodgers and Los Angeles Lakers radio networks. On August 12, 2016, KPSI and sister station KWXY went silent.

In October 2016, Desert Broadcasters agreed to acquire KPSI and KWXY from Ric and Rozene Supple's R&R Radio Corporation. The call letters were changed to KKGX on February 2, 2017. On March 14, 2017, both KKGX and KWXY returned to the air stunting. The on-air moniker of ‘KGX’ (a truncation of the legal ‘KKGX’ call sign) was a mash-up and homage to legendary three call-letter California radio stations KGO, KNX and KGB. KGX debuted a conservative talk format branded "Real Talk" on March 16. The purchase by Desert Broadcasters was consummated on March 31, 2017.

Effective June 9, 2021, Desert Broadcasters sold KKGX, KWXY and two translators to Louie Comella's IVOX MEDIA LLC for $105,000 as part of a larger package deal. The sale included the old KDES (AM) tower site in Palm Springs for $220,000 and the original KWXY "Broadcast Center" building for $550,000. The 920 AM tower site on its 28.4 acres (11.36 ha) will be expanded to become the new home of the IVOX+ streaming platform as well as a future independent motion picture studio lot and theater venue, although the property lacks public road access. Both stations were off the air for four months beginning in August. At noon on December 12, 2021, they returned to the air with a four-hour special, "Frank Sinatra: Remembering An American Legend," hosted by Wink Martindale. Following the special, both stations began playing Christmas music. On December 27, KKGX relaunched as "Alternative Talk Radio", abandoning the unique 'KGX' branding, and using only the legal call letters 'KKGX' on-air.

Plans are underway to stream the station worldwide via the IVOX+ platform.

Previous logo

References

External links

KGX
Radio stations established in 1956
1956 establishments in California
Talk radio stations in the United States